Chitralahari  is a 2019 Indian Telugu-language comedy drama film written and directed by Kishore Tirumala and produced by Mythri Movie Makers. The film stars Sai Dharam Tej, Kalyani Priyadarshan, and Nivetha Pethuraj, while Sunil, Vennela Kishore, Posani Krishna Murali, and Brahmaji, among others, play supporting roles. The music was composed by Devi Sri Prasad with cinematography by Karthik Ghattamaneni and editing by A. Sreekar Prasad. The film released on 12 April 2019  to mixed to positive reception and become a commercial success.

Plot 

Vijay Krishna  is an engineer who is called a loser because of his bad luck and lack of social skills. He is often misunderstood and rejected by everybody except for his father Narayana, who supports him in every situation. He is, however an intelligent graduate who has an idea for an app to help people in road accidents and is looking for investors. He is in a relationship with Lahari, but he lies to her that he does not drink. Whenever he goes to the bar, he often drinks with his friend Mike, who is a writer. They call themselves "Glassmates". He also never mentions that he works at a TV repair shop part-time and only mentions that he is working on a project. Vijay pitches his idea but is insulted by Janardhan, an executive in a company  who calls him unfit to complete his project because people do not care about rules. Vijay challenges Janardhan in front of his staff arrogantly and confidently. Lahari finds out the truth with the help of her friend Swecha, who is very hostile towards men who also listens to Vijay's pitch, and breaks up with Vijay. Swecha, however, gives Vijay a chance and takes him to Mumbai where he completes the project. While they are in Mumbai, they stay in one of the employee's houses, Kishore, who calls Swecha "sister" because he thinks Swetha has a negative attitude towards men. When they were done with the project plan and executing the plan. Janardhan makes the plan fail again. This makes Vijay angry, and he thinks he is fit for nothing. Before he leaves Mumbai, he finds out that Lahari and Swecha are friends and tells Lahari it was not her decision to break up with him. In order to complete the project, Vijay plans and executes an accident to prove his device's capability. After the accident, he is brought to court, where he is accused of being reckless and irresponsible in order to bring the app to public attention. The public prosecutor gives him a hard time with a barrage of allegations. During the interval, Lahari expresses her unconditional love for him. Once the session resumes again, he is given the right to pursue his dream by the judge.

Cast 

 Sai Dharam Tej as Vijay Krishna "Vijay"
 Kalyani Priyadarshan as Lahari
 Nivetha Pethuraj as K. Swecha
 Sunil as Michael "Mike" / Glassmate
 Vennela Kishore as Kishore
 Posani Krishna Murali as Narayana, Vijay's father
 Bramhaji as Janardhan
 Himaja as Navneetha
 Pavitra Lokesh as Swecha's mother
 Jayaprakash as CEO
 Rohini Hattangadi as Judge
 Rao Ramesh as Lawyer Purushottham
 Bharath Reddy as Bharath
 Hyper Aadi as Ajay 
 Prabhas Sreenu as Repair Shop Owner
 Sudharshan as Vijay's friend
 Yeisha Adarah as Lahari's friend

Production 
On 15 October 2018, it is announced that Kishore Tirumala will be directing Sai Dharam Tej's next movie, Chitralahari, on Mythri Movie Makers. On the same day, other cast and crew were announced. The regular shooting started from 19 November 2018 and completed by March 2019.  The film was released on 12 April 2019.

Music 

Music is composed by Devi Sri Prasad.

Reception

Critical reception 
The Hindus Sangeethe Devi Dundoo, wrote that "Chitralahari has its moments, but the different thoughts and characters don’t blend into a cohesive narrative." Neeshita Nyapati of The Times of India, rated 3 out of 5 stars called it a "perfect summer watch." While praising the performance of the lead cast, Nyayapati wrote that "Unfortunately, it is the rest of the stupendous cast that get the short end of the stick, wasted in the roles given to them."

Hemanth Kumar writing for the Firstpost gave the film 2.5 out of 5. While praising Sai Dharam Tej's performance, Kumar opined that "Chitralahari ends up being a film that seemed far more interesting as an idea." Suresh Kavirayani of Deccan Chronicle also gave 2.5 out of five stars and wrote "Devi Sri Prasad’s songs are the high points of the film," while also adding that Karthik Ghattamaneni's cinematography and Kishore Tirumala's writing are decent.

Box office
The film opened in USA with $234,000 during the opening weekend. By the end of its theatrical run, Chitralahari grossed around  worldwide.

References

External links 

2010s Telugu-language films
Indian romantic comedy-drama films
Films directed by Kishore Tirumala
2019 films
2019 romantic comedy-drama films
Films scored by Devi Sri Prasad
Films set in Mumbai
Films shot in Mumbai
Films set in Maharashtra
Films shot in Maharashtra
Films set in Hyderabad, India
Films shot in Hyderabad, India
Mythri Movie Makers films